Pyotr Petrovich Glebov (14 April 1915 – 17 April 2000), was a Russian film actor from the aristocratic Glebov family, whose early generations are listed in the 17th-century Velvet Book.

Glebov's more recent ancestors include Count Vasily Orlov, Prince Nicholas Troubetzkoy, and Prince Peter Wittgenstein. His aunts were married to Prince Alexander Galitzine, Count Yury Olsufieff, and to one of Leo Tolstoy's sons. Sergey Mikhalkov was a first cousin, and Svyatoslav Belza was his son-in-law.

In 1940, Glebov graduated from the Stanislavsky School where his teachers included Mikhail Kedrov. When World War II broke out, the young actor volunteered to fight for the Red Army. He took part in the Battle of Moscow as an anti-aircraft gunner.

Despite a noble background, Glebov made a spectacular career in the Soviet cinema. He is best known for portraying the Cossack protagonist in the 1958 epic And Quiet Flows the Don, a trilogy directed by Sergei Gerasimov. In 1981, Glebov was named a People's Artist of the USSR and was awarded the Order of Lenin. He is buried in the Vagankovo Cemetery.

Partial filmography

Lyubimaya devushka (1940) - Spectator in the stands (uncredited)
Mechta (1943)
The Train Goes East (1948) - Military on the station in Moscow (uncredited)
And Quiet Flows the Don (1957-1958, part 2, 3) - Grigori Melekhov
Virgin Soil Upturned (1960, part 1, 2) - Aleksandr Polovtsev
Baltic Skies (1961, part 1, 2) - Lunin
Mozart and Salieri (1962) - Salieri
Iolanta (1963) - Eon-Hakkia
Tsarskaya nevesta (1965) - Tsar Ivan
The Tsar's Bride (1965) - Tsar Ivan
Odinochestvo (1965) - Pyotr Storozhev
A teper sudi... (1967) - Illarion Groza
Oni zhivut ryadom (1968) - Korablyov
Vozmezdie (1969)
Not Under the Jurisdiction (1969) - Pyotr Samoylov
Liberation (1970, part 1, 3) - Pavel Rotmistrov
Morskoy kharakter (1970) - Yakov Ivanovich Arkhipov
Kochuyushchiy front (1971) - Petr Zhtzhinkin
Smertnyy vrag (1972) - Vlas
Sluchaynyy adres (1973) - Ivan Kupriyanovich
Zarevo nad Drava (1974)
Smotret v glaza... (1975) - Ivan Davidenko
Na kray sveta (1975) - dyadya Vasya
Na yasnyy ogon (1976) - Predsedatel gubkoma
Pugachev (1979) - Stepan Fedulov
Yunost Petra (1980)
Vsadnik na zolotom kone (1981) - Katil-Badtscha
Muzhiki! (1981) - otets Pavla
Formula sveta (1982)
Polyn - trava gorkaya (1983)
Uragan prikhodit neozhidanno (1984)
Nasledstvo (1984)
Idushchiy sledom (1984)
Postaraysya ostatsya zhivym (1986) - General Arhipov
Skakal kazak cherez dolinu (1986) - Lukich- militsioner
Premyera v Sosnovke (1986) - Aleksey Nikiforovich
Bez sroka davnosti (1987)
Dedushka khoroshiy, no... ne govorit, kuda spryatal den'gi (1993)
Bravye parni (1993) - Maj. Konstantin Cherednichenko (final film role)

References

External links

1915 births
2000 deaths
Russian male film actors
People's Artists of the USSR
Recipients of the Order of Lenin
20th-century Russian male actors